The Department for Transport (DfT) is a department of His Majesty's Government responsible for the English transport network and a limited number of transport matters in Scotland, Wales and Northern Ireland that have not been devolved. The department is run by the Secretary of State for Transport, currently (since 25 October 2022) Mark Harper.

The expenditure, administration and policy of the Department for Transport are scrutinised by the Transport Committee.

History

The Ministry of Transport was established by the Ministry of Transport Act 1919 which provided for the transfer to the new ministry of powers and duties of any government department in respect of railways, light railways, tramways, canals and inland waterways, roads, bridges and ferries, and vehicles and traffic thereon, harbours, docks and piers.

In September 1919, all the powers of the Road Board, the Ministry of Health, and the Board of Trade in respect of transport, were transferred to the new ministry. Initially, the department was organised to carry out supervisory, development and executive functions, but the end of railway and canal control by 1921, and the settlement of financial agreements relating to the wartime operations of the railways reduced its role. In 1923, the department was reorganised into three major sections: Secretarial, Finance and Roads.

The ministry's functions were exercised initially throughout the United Kingdom. An Irish Branch was established in 1920, but then was taken over by the government of the Irish Free State on the transfer of functions in 1922.

The department took over transport functions of Scottish departments in the same year, though certain functions relating to local government, loan sanction, byelaws and housing were excepted. In May 1937, power to make provisional orders for harbour, pier and ferry works was transferred to the Secretary of State for Scotland.

The growth of road transport increased the responsibilities of the Ministry, and in the 1930s, and especially with defence preparations preceding the outbreak of war, government responsibilities for all means of transport increased significantly.

Government control of transport and diverse associated matters has been reorganised a number of times in modern history, being the responsibility of:

1919–1941: Ministry of Transport
1941–1946: Ministry of War Transport, after absorption of Ministry of Shipping
1946–1953: Ministry of Transport
1953–1959: Ministry of Transport and Civil Aviation
1959–1970: Ministry of Transport
1970–1976: Department of the Environment
1976–1997: Department of Transport
1997–2001: Department for the Environment, Transport and the Regions
2001–2002: Department for Transport, Local Government and the Regions
2002–present: Department for Transport

The name "Ministry of Transport" lives on in the annual MOT test, a test of vehicle safety, roadworthiness, and exhaust emissions, which most vehicles used on public roads in the UK are required to pass annually once they reach three years old (four years for vehicles in Northern Ireland).

Role
The Department for Transport has six strategic objectives:
 Support the creation of a stronger, cleaner, more productive economy
 Help to connect people and places, balancing investment across the country
 Make journeys easier, modern and reliable
 Make sure transport is safe, secure and sustainable
 Prepare the transport system for technological progress and a prosperous future outside the EU
 Promote a culture of efficiency and productivity in everything it does

The department "creates the strategic framework" for transport services, which are delivered through a wide range of public and private sector bodies including its own executive agencies.

Ministers 
The DfT Ministers are as follows:

The Permanent Secretary is Bernadette Kelly.

2017 judicial review 
Following a series of strikes, poor performance, concerns over access for the disabled and commuter protests relating to Govia Thameslink Railway a group of commuters crowdfunded £26,000 to initiate a judicial review into the Department for Transport's management and failure to penalise Govia or remove the management contract. The oral hearing to determine if commuters have standing to bring a judicial review was listed for 29 June 2017 at the Royal Courts of Justice.

The attempted judicial review was not allowed to proceed, and the commuters who brought it had to pay £17,000 in costs to the Department for Transport.

Executive agencies 
Driver and Vehicle Licensing Agency (DVLA)
Driver and Vehicle Standards Agency (DVSA)
National Highways  (formerly Highways England and the Highways Agency) 
Maritime and Coastguard Agency (MCA)
Vehicle Certification Agency (VCA)

Non-departmental public bodies 
The DfT sponsors the following public bodies:
British Transport Police Authority
Northern Lighthouse Board
Transport Focus
Trinity House Lighthouse Service
Civil Aviation Authority
Independent Commission on Civil Aviation Noise

Transport publications and data 
DfT publications include the Design Manual for Roads and Bridges and Transport Analysis Guidance (TAG, formerly WebTAG).

The DfT maintains datasets including the National Trip End Model and traffic counts on major roads.

Devolution 
The devolution of transport policy varies around the UK; most aspects in Great Britain are decided at Westminster. Key reserved transport matters (i.e., not devolved) are as follows:

Scotland
Reserved matters:
Air transport 
Marine transport
Navigation (including merchant shipping)
Driving and vehicle certification
Railways (cross-border)
Road Numbering
Scotland's comparability factor (the proportion of spending in this area devolved to the Scottish Government) was 91.7% for 2021/22.

Northern Ireland
Reserved matters:
 Civil aviation
 Navigation (including merchant shipping)

The department's devolved counterparts in Northern Ireland are:
 Department for Infrastructure (general transport policy, ports, roads, and rail)
 Department of the Environment (road safety and the regulation of drivers and vehicles)
Northern Ireland's comparability factor (the proportion of spending in this area devolved to the Northern Ireland Executive) was 95.4% for 2021/22.

Wales
Reserved matters:
Railway Services 
Air transport 
Marine transport including Trust ports and Hovercrafts
Transport security
Navigation (including merchant shipping)
Driving and vehicle certification
Road Numbering

The department's devolved counterpart in Wales is the Minister for Climate Change.

Wales' comparability factor (the proportion of spending in this area devolved to the Welsh Government) was 36.6% for 2021/22. This represents a significant reduction (e.g. it was 80.9% in 2015) due to the controversial classification of HS2 as an 'England and Wales' project.

See also

 Julie, a public information film of the department's "THINK!" campaign
 DfT OLR Holdings, a DfT subsidiary acting as operator of last resort for nationalised railway franchises
 Transport Direct
 Transport Research Laboratory (formerly known as the Road Research Laboratory, then the Transport and Road Research Laboratory); now a privatised company
 United Kingdom budget
 Urban Traffic Management and Control
 Rail transport in Great Britain

References

External links 
 

 
Transport in the United Kingdom
2002 establishments in the United Kingdom